York Island is an island in the Caribbean Sea that belongs to Antigua and Barbuda. It is located east of the main island of Antigua.

References

External links
 TravelingLuck- location

Islands of Antigua and Barbuda